Sugar Bush is an unincorporated community located in the town of Humboldt, Brown County, Wisconsin, United States. The name was given due to a sizeable grove of sugar maple trees there.The hamlet was once known as Schiller. St. Hubert Parish of Sugarbush was established in 1872 as a mission church serving the Walloon Belgian community. 

In 1887 Telesphore Charlier, who operated a hotel, bar, and livery stable, opened a post office.

References

Unincorporated communities in Brown County, Wisconsin
Unincorporated communities in Wisconsin
Green Bay metropolitan area